The 2022 Argentina Open was a men's tennis tournament played on outdoor clay courts. It was the 25th edition of the ATP Buenos Aires event, and part of the ATP Tour 250 series of the 2022 ATP Tour. It took place in Buenos Aires, Argentina, from 7 to 13 February 2022.

The tournament marked the return of US Open champion and former world No. 3 Juan Martín del Potro of Argentina from knee injury. He had not played an ATP match since June 2019.

Finals

Singles 

  Casper Ruud def.  Diego Schwartzman, 5–7, 6–2, 6–3

Doubles 

  Santiago González /  Andrés Molteni def.  Fabio Fognini /  Horacio Zeballos, 6–1, 6–1

Points and prize money

Point distribution

Prize money 

*per team

Singles main draw entrants

Seeds

1 Rankings are as of 31 January 2022.

Other entrants 
The following players received wildcards into the singles main draw:
  Sebastián Báez 
  Juan Martín del Potro 
  Holger Rune

The following players received special exempts into the main draw:
  Juan Ignacio Londero 
  Alejandro Tabilo 

The following players received entry using a protected ranking into the singles main draw:
  Pablo Andújar
  Pablo Cuevas
  Fernando Verdasco

The following players received entry from the qualifying draw:
  Francisco Cerúndolo
  Hugo Dellien 
  Tomás Martín Etcheverry 
  Nicolás Jarry

Withdrawals 
 Before the tournament
  Dominic Thiem → replaced by  Thiago Monteiro

Doubles main draw entrants

Seeds 

1 Rankings as of 31 January 2022.

Other entrants 
The following pairs received wildcards into the doubles main draw:
  Francisco Cerúndolo /  Tomás Martín Etcheverry 
  Holger Rune /  Thiago Agustín Tirante

The following pairs received entry as alternates into the doubles main draw:
  Marco Cecchinato /  Carlos Taberner
  Hernán Casanova /  Sergio Galdós

Withdrawals 
 Before the tournament
  Facundo Bagnis /  Albert Ramos Viñolas → replaced by  Andrea Collarini /  Mario Vilella Martínez
  Simone Bolelli /  Máximo González → replaced by  Hernán Casanova /  Sergio Galdós
  Marcelo Demoliner /  Miomir Kecmanović → replaced by  Miomir Kecmanović /  Fernando Romboli
  Holger Rune /  Thiago Agustín Tirante → replaced by  Marco Cecchinato /  Carlos Taberner

References

External links 

 

Argentina Open
Argentina Open
ATP Buenos Aires
Argentina Open